Split-leaf philodendron is a common name for several plants in the Araceae family which may refer to:
Thaumatophyllum bipinnatifidum, a species with large pinnately-lobed leaves
Monstera deliciosa, a species with lobed and perforated leaves bearing edible fruit